Jacob Garber Neff (December 2, 1840 – January 28, 1925) was an American politician who served in the Virginia House of Delegates.

Military career
Neff entered the Confederate States Army and took the rank of captain. He was injured several times during the conflict, but remained in service. He returned to his farm after the war. Soon after, he was made Sheriff for Shenandoah County, but retired early from the position.

Political career
Neff was nominated as the Democratic candidate to represent Shenandoah County in the 1881 Virginia House of Delegates election. His election announcement stated:

He lost the election to George J. Grandstaff, the Readjuster candidate, with 1165 votes compared to his opponent's 1492.

In August 1882, he represented Lee District at the Democratic Convention of Virginia's 7th congressional district. He represented Ashby District in 1893.

1893 election
In October 1893, Neff was again nominated as the candidate for Shenandoah County. He beat J. N. Brennan, the Democratic County Chairman, by four votes. The incumbent Delegate, Philip W. Magruder, had previously turned down the nomination for a fourth term. Neff's campaign leaned on his experience as a farmer and convincing other farmers to support him.

He was elected with 1550 votes, being 336 more than his closest opponent, Republican candidate Daniel Spiker.

Later career
In 1902, Neff was president of the Shenandoah Valley Turnpike Company.

Personal life
He resided in Mount Jackson. His daughter, Cora Neff, married P. M. S. Bird Jr. in May 1902.

References

External links

1840 births
1925 deaths
Democratic Party members of the Virginia House of Delegates
19th-century American politicians
Confederate States Army officers